Charles S. Morris Observatory  is an astronomical observatory owned and operated by Manchester University.  Built in 1973, it is located in North Manchester,  Indiana.

See also 
List of observatories

References

External links
Morris Observatory Clear Sky Clock

Astronomical observatories in Indiana
University and college buildings completed in 1973
Manchester University (Indiana)
Buildings and structures in Wabash County, Indiana